Sabine Appelmans was the defending champion but lost in the second round to Barbara Rittner.

Chanda Rubin won in the final 6–4, 6–2 against Karina Habšudová.

Seeds
A champion seed is indicated in bold text while text in italics indicates the round in which that seed was eliminated. The top two seeds received a bye to the second round.

  Jana Novotná (semifinals)
  Karina Habšudová (final)
  Judith Wiesner (semifinals)
  Sabine Appelmans (second round)
  Magdalena Maleeva (quarterfinals)
  Nathalie Tauziat (quarterfinals)
  Chanda Rubin (champion)
  Åsa Carlsson (quarterfinals)

Draw

Final

Section 1

Section 2

External links
 1997 EA-Generali Ladies Linz Draw

1997 WTA Tour